The Hot Springs Street Railroad ran from Hot Springs to the race track. The future extension of the street railroad to the race track was reported in the Forrest City Times in January 1894. The same company that owned this street railway, also owned the other Hot Springs public utilities companies for water, gas and electricity.

Handling traffic 
The limited number of streetcars owned by the Hot Springs Street Railroad, together with the fact that all those people attending the races wanted to go to the grounds and return to the city at practically the same time, necessitated the adoption of some unusual methods in handling passengers.

entrance to the grounds. The loading yards contained storage tracks for twenty-five cars. All the cars going to the races were put in special service and no fares are collected on them. Instead, the fares were collected as the passengers went through the gates leading into the grounds.

At the end of the races about twenty-five cars are waiting in the loading yard and fares are collected as passengers passed through the 
gates. Four cars were drawn up to the loading platform at a time and were started out at close intervals. The method had the great advantage of securing all fares without trouble.

References 

Defunct Arkansas railroads
Hot Springs, Arkansas
Streetcars in Arkansas
Streetcars articles needing expert attention